The 1976 Toyota Women's Classic, was a women's tennis tournament played on outdoor grass courts at Kooyong in Melbourne in Australia. The event was part of the 1976–1977 Colgate International Series. It was the 14th edition of the tournament and was held from 7 December through 12 December 1976. Sixth-seeded Margaret Court won the singles title, the 191st and final of her career, and earned $9,000 first-prize money.

Winners

Singles
 Margaret Court defeated  Sue Barker 6–2, 6–2
It was Court's 1st title of the year and the 191st and last of her career.

Doubles
 Margaret Court /  Betty Stöve defeated  Linky Boshoff /  Ilana Kloss 6–2, 6–4

Prize money

References

Toyota Women's Classic
Toyota Women's Classic
Tennis tournaments in Australia
Toyota Women's Classic